Paul Cooper (born 6 April 1968) is a former Australian rules footballer who played with Hawthorn in the Australian Football League (AFL) during the 1990s.

Cooper played his football in defence, where he was a consistent ball winner. He had a strong debut season in 1990 and got his first taste of September action, with 19 disposals in an elimination final loss to Melbourne at the MCG. The following year he could only manage seven games, all in the second half of the season and missed out on Hawthorn's finals campaign which saw them win their ninth premiership.

From 1993 to 1995, Cooper was a regular fixture in the Hawthorn team, with the aging stars of the 1980s retiring from the game and freeing up spaces in the side. He had his best season in 1993 when he put together 396 disposals, at just under 20 a game.

Statistics

|- style="background-color: #EAEAEA"
| scope="row" | 1990 ||  || 32
| 15 || 1 || 1 || 189 || 58 || 247 || 48 || 13 || 0.1 || 0.1 || 12.6 || 3.9 || 16.5 || 3.2 || 0.9 || 0
|-
| scope="row" | 1991 ||  || 26
| 7 || 0 || 1 || 64 || 20 || 84 || 21 || 7 || 0.0 || 0.1 || 9.1 || 2.9 || 12.0 || 3.0 || 1.0 || 0
|- style="background-color: #EAEAEA"
| scope="row" | 1992 ||  || 26
| 6 || 2 || 2 || 62 || 17 || 79 || 19 || 9 || 0.3 || 0.3 || 10.3 || 2.8 || 13.2 || 3.2 || 1.5 || 1
|-
| scope="row" | 1993 ||  || 26
| 20 || 3 || 2 || 296 || 100 || 396 || 88 || 31 || 0.2 || 0.1 || 14.8 || 5.0 || 19.8 || 4.4 || 1.5 || 0
|- style="background-color: #EAEAEA"
| scope="row" | 1994 ||  || 26
| 16 || 2 || 4 || 154 || 64 || 218 || 51 || 24 || 0.1 || 0.2 || 9.6 || 4.0 || 13.6 || 3.2 || 1.5 || 0
|-
| scope="row" | 1995 ||  || 26
| 15 || 1 || 0 || 181 || 64 || 245 || 57 || 24 || 0.1 || 0.0 || 12.1 || 4.3 || 16.3 || 3.8 || 1.6 || 0
|- style="background-color: #EAEAEA"
| scope="row" | 1996 ||  || 26
| 2 || 0 || 0 || 17 || 11 || 28 || 4 || 3 || 0.0 || 0.0 || 8.5 || 5.5 || 14.0 || 2.0 || 1.5 || 0
|- class="sortbottom"
! colspan=3| Career
! 81 !! 9 !! 10 !! 963 !! 334 !! 1297 !! 288 !! 111 !! 0.1 !! 0.1 !! 11.9 !! 4.1 !! 16.0 !! 3.6 !! 1.4 !! 1
|}

References

1968 births
Hawthorn Football Club players
Australian rules footballers from Victoria (Australia)
Living people